Pablo Nascimento Castro (born 21 June 1991), simply known as Pablo, is Brazilian professional footballer who plays as a central defender for Flamengo. He made two appearances for the Brazil national team in 2018.

Club career

Brazil
Born in São Luís, Maranhão, Pablo graduated from the youth setup of Ceará and made his senior debut in 2010, in Série A. On 7 January 2012, he joined Grêmio for the upcoming season. After appearing rarely for the side, he left the club on 13 December.

On 9 January 2013, Pablo moved to Série B club Avaí. On 29 November, he scored his first Série B goal in a 1–0 victory over Boa. He played regularly during the 2014 season, as fellow league club Flamengo expressing their desire to secure his services

On 8 January 2015, Pablo returned to the top flight and joined Ponte Preta. On 9 August, he scored his first goal for the club in a 1–0 win against Flamengo.

Bordeaux, and Corinthians loan
On 31 August 2015, Pablo moved abroad and joined French Ligue 1 club Bordeaux on a four-year contract. He made his Europa League debut on 17 September against Liverpool; and was nutmegged by Adam Lallana in the 1–1 draw. On 26 September, he scored his first goal for the club in a 3–1 victory against Lyon.

On 1 January 2017, Pablo was loaned out to Brazilian club Corinthians. He played 51 times during the season, with the side winning the Campeonato Paulista and Série A.

Lokomotiv Moscow 
On 15 January 2021, Pablo signed a three-and-a-half-year deal with Russian Premier League side Lokomotiv Moscow.

Flamengo 
On 14 March 2022, Lokomotiv Moscow announced the transfer of Pablo to Flamengo.

International career
On 12 October 2018, Pablo made his international debut for the Brazil national team playing the full 90 minutes of a 2–0 victory against Saudi Arabia in a friendly match.

Career statistics

Honours
Corinthians
Campeonato Brasileiro Série A: 2017
Campeonato Paulista: 2017

Lokomotiv Moscow
Russian Cup: 2020–21

Flamengo
Copa do Brasil: 2022
 Copa Libertadores: 2022

Individual
Campeonato Paulista Team of the year: 2017

References

External links

1991 births
Living people
People from São Luís, Maranhão
Brazilian footballers
Brazil international footballers
Association football central defenders
Ceará Sporting Club players
Grêmio Foot-Ball Porto Alegrense players
Avaí FC players
Associação Atlética Ponte Preta players
Sport Club Corinthians Paulista players
FC Girondins de Bordeaux players
FC Lokomotiv Moscow players
CR Flamengo footballers
Campeonato Brasileiro Série A players
Campeonato Brasileiro Série B players
Ligue 1 players
Copa Libertadores-winning players
Championnat National 3 players
Russian Premier League players
Brazilian expatriate footballers
Expatriate footballers in France
Expatriate footballers in Russia
Brazilian expatriate sportspeople in France
Brazilian expatriate sportspeople in Russia
Sportspeople from Maranhão